Here We Are may refer to:

Albums
 Here We Are (Heroes album)
 Here We Are (A Global Threat album)
 Here We Are (Yoomiii album)

Songs
 "Here We Are" (Gloria Estefan song), 1989
 "Here We Are" (Alabama song), 1991
 "Here We Are", a song on Lene Marlin's album Twist the Truth, 2009
 "Here We Are", a song by the Fray from Scars & Stories, 2012
 "Here We Are", a song by Breaking Benjamin from Phobia
 "Here We Are", a track from the soundtrack of the 2015 video game Undertale by Toby Fox

Other uses
 "Here We Are" (short story), a 1931 short story by Dorothy Parker
 Here We Are (one-act play), a stage adaptation of the Dorothy Parker story
 Here We Are (novel), a 2020 novel by Graham Swift
 Here We Are (film), 2020 Israeli film
 Here We Are!, 1979 Estonian film

See also
 We Are Here (disambiguation)